State routes in Maine are highways within the Maine State Highway System that are signed and maintained by the Maine Department of Transportation, and not U.S. Routes or routes of the Interstate highway system. Some parts of these roads are maintained by local government authorities. There are over 100 State routes.

Note about termini:  In several cases there is disagreement between the administrative termini of a route (which are defined by MaineDOT) and the termini signed in the field.  All termini listed on this page are administrative termini; discrepancies are listed on the respective pages.



Primary and secondary routes

Special routes

Routes crossing state borders
New Hampshire Route 113B and New Hampshire Route 153 enter Maine.  NH 153 remains entirely under NHDOT maintenance.  NH 113B is a loop of Maine State Route 113.  The spans of NH 113B within Maine are considered unnumbered highway by the MDOT.  SR 113 enters New Hampshire several times but remains under MDOT maintenance.

New England Interstates

See also

References

External links
RoadsAroundME
A History of Maine Roads 1600 - 1970.

 
State